The Apollo 17 lunar sample display consists of a Moon rock fragment from a lava Moon stone identified as lunar basalt 70017, the recipient's flag and two small metal plates attached with descriptive messages. A goodwill gift from the Apollo 17 mission was then given by President Richard Nixon in the form of a wooden commemorative plaque display to all fifty U.S. states and U.S. territories, and 135 nations worldwide.

Collection

Eugene Cernan and Harrison Schmitt ended their walk on the Moon in 1972 with a dedication to the young people of Earth and a desire that all "live in peace and harmony in the future". They expressed hope that distribution of pieces of the rock they had collected would bring this worldwide peace and goodwill.

Description
 They were presented with a letter from Nixon, stating that:

Fate 

The New York Times reported in 2012 that gifts of moon rocks were not well tracked or managed by NASA. Within the US, public gifts require legislation to be transferred, but other nations set their own laws. Some samples of lunar dust soil from the earlier Apollo 11 and samples from the Apollo 17 missions have been reported missing. Since 2005 entities and people have made concerted efforts to find the displays. Joseph Gutheinz, a former NASA Office of Inspector General special agent and a professor who teaches an online course at the University of Phoenix, had his students try to locate the displays. Robert Pearlman of collectSPACE has also tracked the displays. Robert Pearlman of collectSPACE has also tracked the displays.

See also
 Apollo 11 lunar sample display
 List of Apollo lunar sample displays

References

Further reading 
 

Display
Apollo program lunar sample displays
Lunar samples
Foreign relations of the United States
Gene Cernan
Harrison Schmitt
Basalt